The 1994 Hockey East Men's Ice Hockey Tournament was the 10th Tournament in the history of the conference. It was played between March 11 and March 19, 1994. Quarterfinal games were played at home team campus sites, while the final four games were played at the Boston Garden in Boston, Massachusetts, the home venue of the NHL's Boston Bruins. By winning the tournament, Boston University received the Hockey East's automatic bid to the 1994 NCAA Division I Men's Ice Hockey Tournament.

Format
The tournament featured three rounds of play. In the first round, the first and eighth seeds, the second and seventh seeds, the third seed and sixth seeds, and the fourth seed and fifth seeds played a best-of-three with the winner advancing to the semifinals. In the semifinals, the highest and lowest seeds and second highest and second lowest seeds play a single-elimination game, with the winners advancing to the championship game and the losers meeting in a third-place game. The tournament champion receives an automatic bid to the 1994 NCAA Division I Men's Ice Hockey Tournament.

Conference standings
Note: GP = Games played; W = Wins; L = Losses; T = Ties; PTS = Points; GF = Goals For; GA = Goals Against

Bracket

Teams are reseeded after the quarterfinals

Note: * denotes overtime period(s)

Quarterfinals

(1) Boston University vs. (8) Maine

(2) Massachusetts-Lowell vs. (7) Merrimack

(3) New Hampshire vs. (6) Boston College

(4) Northeastern vs. (5) Providence

Semifinals

(1) Boston University vs. (4) Northeastern

(2) Massachusetts-Lowell vs. (3) New Hampshire

Third Place

(3) New Hampshire vs. (4) Northeastern

Championship

(1) Boston University vs. (2) Massachusetts-Lowell

Tournament awards

All-Tournament Team
F Eric Boguniecki (New Hampshire)
F Greg Bullock (Massachusetts-Lowell)
F Jacques Joubert (Boston University)
D Rich Brennan (Boston University)
D Kaj Linna (Boston University)
G Dwayne Roloson* (Massachusetts-Lowell)
* Tournament MVP(s)

References

External links
Hockey East Online

Hockey East Men's Ice Hockey Tournament
HE tournament